Jason Edward Gilfillan (born August 31, 1976) is a former Major League Baseball pitcher who played for one season. He pitched in 13 games for the Kansas City Royals during the 2003 season.

External links

1976 births
Living people
Kansas City Royals players
Major League Baseball pitchers
Baseball players from North Carolina
College of Charleston Cougars baseball players
People from Shelby, North Carolina
Limestone Saints baseball players
Charleston AlleyCats players
Colorado Springs Sky Sox players
Gulf Coast Royals players
Omaha Golden Spikes players
Omaha Royals players
Spokane Indians players
Wichita Wranglers players
Wilmington Blue Rocks players